Machhagarh is a village in Saharpada, Kendujhar district, Odisha, India.

References

Villages in Kendujhar district